Vivi Markussen (24 October 1939 – 22 December 2010) was a Danish sprinter. She competed in the women's 100 metres at the 1960 Summer Olympics.

References

1939 births
2010 deaths
Athletes (track and field) at the 1960 Summer Olympics
Danish female sprinters
Olympic athletes of Denmark
Place of birth missing
Olympic female sprinters